Daniela Yaniv-Richter (born November 5, 1956) is an Israeli ceramist and sculptor.

Biography
Yaniv-Richter was born in Zürich, Switzerland, and made aliyah to Israel in 1975. She graduated from the Bezalel Academy of Arts and Design, Jerusalem in 1982. She studied further in the Eastern Michigan University till 1983, then proceeded to MFA studies at the University of Michigan, Ann Arbor. She received her MFA in 1985.

Among other subjects, her works deals with the replication of natural and man-made objects. In the past years Yaniv-Richter has put aside ceramics – her known medium of choice – and started printing textures of different materials on paper and textile.

Yaniv-Richter resides and works in Jerusalem.

Publications
 Gispan-Greenberg, Tamar. "Natural Process: Daniela Yaniv-Richter", Ceramics Art and Perception, Issue 94, Dec 2013, p. 26–29 
 Gispan-Greenberg, Tamar. "Natural Process", Exhibition Catalog. Jerusalem Artists' House, 2012.
 Zommer, Raya. "Ready-mades from clay", Ceramics Technical, Issue 19, 2004

References

1956 births
Living people
20th-century Israeli women artists
21st-century Israeli women artists
21st-century ceramists
Israeli Jews
Artists from Jerusalem
Artists from Zürich
Israeli ceramists
Israeli people of Swiss-Jewish descent
Israeli sculptors
Israeli women sculptors
Swiss emigrants to Israel
Swiss Jews
Bezalel Academy of Arts and Design alumni
Eastern Michigan University alumni
University of Michigan alumni
Israeli expatriates in Switzerland
Swiss people of Israeli descent
Israeli women ceramists